The Cannstatter Wasen is a 35 hectare festival area on the banks of the Neckar river in the part of Stuttgart known as Bad Cannstatt.

The Cannstatter Wasen form part of the Neckar Park Fairground.

Each year the Wasen hosts the Cannstatter Volksfest and the Stuttgart Spring Festival, along with other events such as concerts and circuses.

See also

Fruit Column
Beer festival

Geography of Stuttgart
Defunct airports in Germany